Wheelchair basketball at the 1972 Summer Paralympics consisted of men's and women's team events.

Medal summary 

Source: Paralympic.org

Classification system

From 1969 to 1973, a classification system designed by Australian Dr. Bedwell was used.  This system used some muscle testing to determine which class incomplete paraplegics should be classified in.  It used a point system based on the ISMGF classification system. Class IA, IB and IC were worth 1 point.  Class II for people with lesions between T1-T5 and no balance were also worth 1 point.  Class III for people with lesions at T6-T10 and have fair balance were worth 1 point.  Class IV was for people with lesions at T11-L3 and good trunk muscles.  They were worth 2 points. Class V was for people with lesions at L4 to L5 with good leg muscles.  Class IV was for people with lesions at S1-S4 with good leg muscles.  Class V and IV were worth 3 points. The Daniels/Worthington muscle test was used to determine who was in class V and who was class IV.  Paraplegics with 61 to 80 points on this scale were not eligible. A team could have a maximum of 11 points on the floor.

See also
Basketball at the 1972 Summer Olympics

References 

 

1972 Summer Paralympics events
1972
1972 in basketball
International basketball competitions hosted by West Germany